Route 505 is a regional highway in Israel and the occupied Palestinian West Bank.

History 
Until the 1990s, only Route 505 was considered the "Trans-Samaria Highway". At this point, the road (today's Highway 5) connected to the old Route 505, which crossed Kfar Kassem. 

An early improvement was to extend and pave Route 5 along an additional  as a bypass road, which ended where the Sha'ar Shomron Interchange exists now. Eastward beyond that, the Trans-Samaria Highway was only Route 505. Since November 2008, route 5 has ended at the Ariel junction, where it connects with Route 505 which continues as the "Trans-Samaria Highway" to the intersection with the Highway 90 in the Petza'el intersection in the Jordan Valley. 

In 2010 Minister of Transportation Yisrael Katz ordered the planning for the route to connect the Gush Dan region with the Jordan Valley.

See also
List of highways in Israel

References

505
Roads in Israeli-occupied territories